The 1996–97 NCAA Division III men's ice hockey season began in November 1996 and concluded on March 22 of the following year. This was the 24th season of Division III college ice hockey.

Regular season

Season tournaments

Standings

Note: Mini-game are not included in final standings

1997 NCAA Tournament

Note: * denotes overtime period(s)

See also
 1996–97 NCAA Division I men's ice hockey season
 1996–97 NCAA Division II men's ice hockey season

References

External links

 
NCAA